The Misty Range is a mountain range of the Canadian Rockies located east of the Bighorn Highway within Kananaskis Country, Canada. 

It is a sub-range of the High Rock Range in the Southern Continental Ranges.

This range includes the following mountains and peaks:

See also
Ranges of the Canadian Rockies

References

Mountain ranges of Alberta
Ranges of the Canadian Rockies